Franz Merkhoffer (born 29 November 1946) is a retired German footballer. He is the record holder for most games played for Eintracht Braunschweig, where he spent his whole professional career.

Career 

After playing youth and amateur football for his hometown club MTV Dettum and Hamburger SV Amateure, Merkhoffer joined Bundesliga side Eintracht Braunschweig in 1968. In Braunschweig he played 419 games in the Bundesliga between 1968 and 1983, becoming a mainstay in the club's defense for almost 16 years.

Post-retirement 

After retiring from football in 1984, Merkhoffer went into horse breeding.

Personal life  

Merkhoffer is father-in-law to American soccer player Jacob Thomas, who married Merkhoffer's daughter during his stay as a player at Eintracht Braunschweig.

References

External links
 

1946 births
Living people
People from Wolfenbüttel (district)
Footballers from Lower Saxony
Association football defenders
German footballers
Germany under-21 international footballers
Hamburger SV II players
Eintracht Braunschweig players
Bundesliga players
2. Bundesliga players